Howard Victor Keen (March 16, 1899 – December 10, 1976) was an American professional baseball pitcher. He played in Major League Baseball (MLB) for the Philadelphia Athletics, Chicago Cubs, and St. Louis Cardinals.

External links

1899 births
1976 deaths
Major League Baseball pitchers
Chicago Cubs players
Philadelphia Athletics players
St. Louis Cardinals players
Minor league baseball managers
Baseball players from Maryland
Petersburg Goobers players
Wichita Falls Spudders players
Toronto Maple Leafs (International League) players
Rochester Red Wings players
Baltimore Orioles (IL) players
Pocomoke City Red Sox players
People from Bel Air, Maryland
Maryland Terrapins baseball players